O'Shea Jackson Sr. (born June 15, 1969), known professionally as Ice Cube, is an American rapper, actor, and filmmaker. His lyrics on N.W.A's 1988 album Straight Outta Compton contributed to gangsta rap's widespread popularity, and his political rap solo albums AmeriKKKa's Most Wanted (1990), Death Certificate (1991), and The Predator (1992) were all critically and commercially successful. He was inducted into the Rock and Roll Hall of Fame as a member of N.W.A in 2016.

A native of Los Angeles, Jackson formed his first rap group called C.I.A. in 1986. In 1987, with Eazy-E and Dr. Dre, he formed the pioneering gangsta rap group N.W.A. As its lead rapper, he wrote some of Dre's and most of Eazy's lyrics on Straight Outta Compton, a landmark album that shaped West Coast hip hop's early identity and helped differentiate it from East Coast rap. N.W.A was also known for their violent lyrics, threatening to attack abusive police and innocent civilians alike, which stirred controversy. After a monetary dispute over the group's management by Eazy-E and Jerry Heller, Cube left N.W.A in late 1989, teaming with New York artists and launching a solo rap career.

Ice Cube has also had an active film career since the early 1990s. He entered cinema by playing Doughboy in director John Singleton's feature debut Boyz n the Hood, a 1991 drama named after a 1987 rap song that Ice Cube wrote. He also co-wrote and starred in the 1995 comedy film Friday; it premised a successful franchise and reshaped his persona into a bankable movie star. He made his directorial debut with the 1998 film The Players Club, and also produced and curated the film's accompanying soundtrack. As of 2020, he has appeared in about 40 films, including the 1999 war comedy Three Kings, family comedies like the Barbershop series, and buddy cop comedies 21 Jump Street, 22 Jump Street, and Ride Along. He was an executive producer of many of these films, as well as of the 2015 biopic Straight Outta Compton.

Life and side ventures

Ice Cube was born on June 15, 1969, in Los Angeles, to Doris, a hospital clerk and custodian, and Hosea Jackson, a machinist and UCLA groundskeeper. He has an older brother, and they had a half-sister who was murdered when Cube was 12. He grew up on Van Wick Street in the Westmont section of South Los Angeles.

In ninth grade at George Washington Preparatory High School in Los Angeles, Cube began writing raps after being challenged by his friend "Kiddo" in typewriting class. Kiddo lost. Explaining his stage name, Cube implicates his older brother: "He threatened to slam me into a freezer and pull me out when I was an ice cube. I just started using that name, and it just caught on."

Cube also attended William Howard Taft High School in Woodland Hills, California. He was bused 40 miles to the suburban school from his home in a high-crime neighborhood. Soon after he wrote and recorded a few locally successful rap songs with N.W.A, he left for Arizona to enroll in the Phoenix Institute of Technology in the fall 1987 semester. In 1988, with a diploma in architectural drafting, he returned to the Los Angeles area and rejoined N.W.A, but kept a career in architecture drafting as a backup plan.

In 1990, he formed his own record label, Street Knowledge, whereby a musical associate via the rap group Public Enemy introduced him to the Nation of Islam (NOI). Ice Cube converted to Islam. Although denying membership in the NOI, whose ideology often rebukes whites and especially Jews, he readily adopted its ideology of black nationalism, familiar to the rap community. Still, he has claimed to heed his own conscience as a "natural Muslim, 'cause it's just me and God". Questioned in 2017, he said, in part, that he thinks "religion is stupid". He estimated, "I'm gonna live a long life, and I might change religions three or four times before I die. I'm on the Islam tip—but I'm on the Christian tip, too. I'm on the Buddhist tip as well. Everyone has something to offer to the world."

On April 26, 1992, Ice Cube married Kimberly Woodruff, born September 1970. They have four children together. In 2005, asked about the balance between his music and parenting, Cube discussed counseling his children to appraise the violence depicted in all media, not just in music lyrics. His eldest son, O'Shea Jackson Jr., portrayed him in the 2015 biopic Straight Outta Compton.

In a 2016 interview, he cited the 1975 film Jaws as his favorite movie, and his favorite among his own songs as "It Was a Good Day". Commercially, Cube has endorsed Coors Light beer and St. Ides malt liquor, and licensed a clothing line, Solo by Cube. In 2017, he launched Big3, a 3-on-3 basketball league starring former NBA players. Its first season started that June with eight teams, an eight-week regular season, playoffs, and a championship game.

Musical career
In 1986 at the age of 16, Ice Cube began rapping in the trio C.I.A., but soon joined the newly formed rap group N.W.A. He was N.W.A's lead rapper and main ghostwriter on its official debut album, 1988's Straight Outta Compton. Via financial dispute, he left by the start of 1990. During 1990, his debut solo album, AmeriKKKa's Most Wanted, found him also leading a featured rap group, Da Lench Mob.

Meanwhile, he helped develop the rapper Yo Yo.

1986: C.I.A.
With friend Sir Jinx, Ice Cube formed the rap group C.I.A., and performed at parties hosted by Dr. Dre. Since 1984, Dre was a member of a popular DJ crew, the World Class Wreckin' Cru, which by 1985 was also performing and recording electro rap. Dre had Cube help write the Wreckin Cru's hit song "Cabbage Patch". Dre also joined Cube on a side project, a duo called Stereo Crew, which made a 12-inch record, "She's a Skag", released on Epic Records in 1986.

In 1987, C.I.A. released the Dr. Dre-produced single "My Posse". Meanwhile, the Wreckin' Cru's home base was the Eve After Dark nightclub, about a quarter of a mile outside of the city Compton in Los Angeles county. While Dre was on the turntable, Ice Cube would rap, often parodying other artists' songs. In one instance, Cube's rendition was "My Penis", parodying Run-DMC's "My Adidas". In 2015, the nightclub's co-owner and Wreckin' leader Alonzo Williams would recall feeling his reputation damaged by this and asking it not to be repeated.

1986–1989: N.W.A.

At 16, Cube sold his first song to Eric Wright, soon dubbed Eazy-E, who was forming Ruthless Records and the musical team N.W.A, based in Compton, California. Himself from South Central Los Angeles, Cube would be N.W.A's only core member not born in Compton.

Upon the success of the song "Boyz-n-the-Hood"—written by Cube, produced by Dre, and rapped by Eazy-E, helping establish gangsta rap in California—Eazy focused on developing N.W.A, which soon gained MC Ren. Cube wrote some of Dre's and nearly all of Eazy's lyrics on N.W.A's official debut album, Straight Outta Compton, released in August 1988. Yet by late 1989, Cube questioned his compensation and N.W.A's management by Jerry Heller.

Cube also wrote most of Eazy-E's debut album Eazy-Duz-It. He received a total pay of $32,000, and the contract that Heller presented in 1989 did not confirm that he was officially an N.W.A member. After leaving the group and its label in December, Cube sued Heller, and the lawsuit was later settled out of court. In response, N.W.A members attacked Cube on the 1990 EP 100 Miles and Runnin', and on N.W.A's next and final album, Niggaz4Life, in 1991.

1989–1993: Early solo career, AmeriKKKa's Most Wanted, Death Certificate, and The Predator
In early 1990, Ice Cube recorded his debut solo album, AmeriKKKa's Most Wanted, in New York with iconic rap group Public Enemy's production team, the Bomb Squad. Arriving in May 1990, it was an instant hit, further swelling rap's mainstream integration. Controversial nonetheless, it drew accusations of misogyny and racism. The album introduces Ice Cube's affirmation of black nationalism and ideology of black struggle.

Cube appointed Yo-Yo, a female rapper and guest on the album, to be the head of his record label, and helped produce her debut album, Make Way for the Motherlode. Also in 1990, Cube followed up with an EP—Kill At Will—critically acclaimed, and rap's first EP certified Platinum.

His second album Death Certificate was released in 1991. The album thought to as more focused, yet even more controversial, triggering accusations of anti-white, antisemitic, and misogynist content. The album was split into two themes: the Death Side, "a vision of where we are today", and the Life Side, "a vision of where we need to go". The track "No Vaseline" scathingly retorts insults directed at him by N.W.A's 1990 EP and 1991 album, which call him a traitor. Besides calling for hanging Eazy-E as a "house nigga", the track blames N.W.A's manager Jerry Heller for exploiting the group, mentions that he is a Jew, and calls for his murder. Ice Cube contended that he mentioned Heller's ethnicity merely incidentally, not to premise attack, but as news media mention nonwhite assailants' races. The track "Black Korea", also deemed racist, was also thought as foreseeing the 1992 Los Angeles riots. While controversial, Death Certificate broadened his audience; he toured with Lollapalooza in 1992.

Cube's third album, The Predator, was released in November 1992. Referring to the 1992 Los Angeles riots, the song "Wicked" opens, "April 29 was power to the people, and we might just see a sequel." The Predator was the first album ever to debut at No. 1 on both the R&B/hip-hop and pop charts. Singles include "It Was a Good Day" and "Check Yo Self", songs having a "two-part" music video. Generally drawing critical praise, the album is his most successful commercially, over three million copies sold in the US. After this album, Cube's rap audience severely diminished, and never regained the prominence of his first three albums.

During this time, Cube began to have numerous features on other artists' songs. In 1992, Cube appeared on Del the Funky Homosapien's debut album I Wish My Brother George Was Here, on Da Lench Mob's debut Guerillas in tha Mist, which he also produced, and on the Kool G Rap and DJ Polo song "Two to the Head". In 1993, he worked on Kam's debut album, and collaborated with Ice-T on the track "Last Wordz" on 2Pac's album Strictly 4 My N.I.G.G.A.Z..

1993–1998: Lethal Injection and forming Westside Connection
Cube's fourth album, Lethal Injection, came out in late 1993. Here, Cube borrowed from the then-popular G-funk popularized by Dr. Dre. Although not received well by critics, the album brought successful singles, including "Really Doe", "Bop Gun (One Nation)", "You Know How We Do It", and "What Can I Do?" After this album, Ice Cube effectively lost his rap audience.

Following Lethal Injection, Cube focused on films and producing albums of other rappers, including Da Lench Mob, Mack 10, Mr. Short Khop, and Kausion. In 1994, Cube teamed with onetime N.W.A groupmate Dr. Dre, who was then leading rap's G-funk subgenre, for the first time since Cube had left the group, and which had disbanded upon Dre's 1991 departure. The result was the Cube and Dre song "Natural Born Killaz", on the Murder Was The Case soundtrack, released by Dre's then-new label, Death Row Records.

In 1995, Cube joined Mack 10 and WC in forming a side trio, the Westside Connection. Feeling neglected by East Coast media, a longstanding issue in rap's bicoastal rivalry, the group aimed to reinforce West pride and resonate with the undervalued. The Westside Connection's first album, Bow Down (1996), featured tracks like "Bow Down" and "Gangstas Make the World Go 'Round" that reflected the group's objectives. The album was certified Platinum by year's end. Interpreting rapper Common's song "I Used to Love H.E.R." as a diss of West Coast rap, Cube and the Westside Connection briefly feuded with him, but they resolved amicably in 1997.

It was also at this time that Cube began collaborating outside the rap genre. In 1997, he worked with David Bowie and Nine Inch Nails singer Trent Reznor on a remix of Bowie's "I'm Afraid of Americans". In 1998, Cube was featured on the band Korn's song "Children of the Korn", and joined them on their Family Values Tour 1998.

1998–2006: War & Peace Vol. 1 & 2 and Westside Connection reunion
In November 1998, Cube released his long-awaited fifth solo album War & Peace Vol. 1 (The War Disc). The delayed sixth album, Volume 2, arrived in 2000. These albums feature the Westside Connection and a reunion with his old N.W.A members Dr. Dre and MC Ren. Cube also received a return favor from Korn, as they appeared on his song "Fuck Dying" from Vol. 1. Many fans maintained that these two albums, especially the second, were lesser in quality to his earlier work. In 2000, Cube also joined Dr. Dre, Eminem, and Snoop Dogg for the Up in Smoke Tour.

In 2002, Cube appeared on British DJ Paul Oakenfold's solo debut album, Bunkka, on the track "Get Em Up".

Released in 2003, Westside Connection's second album, Terrorist Threats, fared well critically, but saw lesser sales. "Gangsta Nation" (featuring Nate Dogg), the only single released, was a radio hit. After a rift between Cube and Mack 10 about Cube's film work minimizing the group's touring, the Westside Connection disbanded in 2005.

In 2004, Cube featured on the song "Real Nigga Roll Call" by Lil Jon & the East Side Boyz, the then leaders of rap's crunk subgenre.

2006–2012: Laugh Now, Cry Later, Raw Footage, and I Am the West
In 2006, Cube released his seventh solo album, Laugh Now, Cry Later, selling 144,000 units in the first week. Lil Jon and Scott Storch produced the lead single, "Why We Thugs". In October, Ice Cube was honored at VH1's Annual Hip Hop Honors, and performed it and also the track "Go to Church". Cube soon toured globally in the Straight Outta Compton Tour—accompanied by rapper WC from the Westside Connection—playing in America, Europe, Australia, and Japan.

Amid Cube's many features and brief collaborations, September 2007 brought In the Movies, a compilation album of Ice Cube songs on soundtracks.

Cube's eighth studio album, Raw Footage, arrived on August 19, 2008, yielding the singles "Gangsta Rap Made Me Do It" and "Do Ya Thang". Also in 2008, Cube helped on Tech N9ne's song "Blackboy", and was featured on The Game's song "State of Emergency".

As a fan of the NFL football team the Raiders, Cube released in October 2009 a tribute song, "Raider Nation". In 2009, Ice Cube performed at the Gathering of the Juggalos, and returned to perform at the 2011 festival.

On September 28, 2010, his ninth solo album, I Am the West, arrived with, Cube says, a direction different from any one of his other albums. Its producers include West Coast veterans like DJ Quik, Dr. Dre, E-A-Ski, and, after nearly 20 years, again Cube's onetime C.I.A groupmate Sir Jinx. Offering the single "I Rep That West", the album debuted at #22 on the Billboard 200 and sold 22,000 copies in its first week. Also in 2010, Cube signed up-and-coming recording artist named 7Tre The Ghost, deemed likely to be either skipped or given the cookie-cutter treatment by most record companies.

In 2011, Cube featured on Daz Dillinger's song "Iz You Ready to Die" and on DJ Quik's song "Boogie Till You Conk Out".

In 2012, Ice Cube recorded a verse for a remix of the Insane Clown Posse song "Chris Benoit", from ICP's The Mighty Death Pop! album, appearing on the album Mike E. Clark's Extra Pop Emporium.

In September 2012, during Pepsi's NFL Anthems campaign, Cube released his second Raiders anthem "Come and Get It".

2012–present: Everythang's Corrupt and forming Mount Westmore
In November 2012, Cube released more details on his forthcoming, tenth studio album, Everythang's Corrupt. Releasing its title track near the 2012 elections, he added, "You know, this record is for the political heads." But the album's release was delayed. On February 10, 2014, iTunes brought another single from it, "Sic Them Youngins on 'Em", and a music video followed the next day. Despite a couple of more song releases, the album's release was delayed even beyond Cube's work on the 2015 film Straight Outta Compton. After a statement setting release to 2017, the album finally arrived on December 7, 2018.

In 2014, Cube appeared on MC Ren's remix "Rebel Music", their first collaboration since the N.W.A reunion in 2000.

In 2020, Cube joined rappers Snoop Dogg, E-40, Too Short and formed the supergroup Mt. Westmore. The group's debut album was released on June 7, 2022.

Film and television career
Since 1991, Ice Cube has acted in nearly 40 films, several of which are highly regarded. Some of them, such as the 1992 thriller Trespass and the 1999 war comedy Three Kings, highlight action. Yet most are comedies, including a few adult-oriented ones, like the Friday franchise, whereas most of these are family-friendly, like the Barbershop franchise.

Narrative
John Singleton's seminal film Boyz n the Hood, released in July 1991, debuted the actor Ice Cube playing Doughboy, a persona that Cube played convincingly. Later, Cube starred with Ice-T and Bill Paxton in Walter Hill's 1992 thriller film Trespass, and in Charles Burnett's 1995 film The Glass Shield. Meanwhile, Cube declined to costar with Janet Jackson in Singleton's 1993 romance Poetic Justice, a role that Tupac Shakur then played.

Cube starred as the university student Fudge in Singleton's 1995 film Higher Learning. Singleton, encouraging Cube, had reportedly told him, "If you can write a record, you can write a movie." Cube cowrote the screenplay for the 1995 comedy Friday, based on adult themes, and starred in it with comedian Chris Tucker. Made with $3.5 million, Friday drew $28 million worldwide. Two sequels, Next Friday and Friday After Next, were respectively released in 2000 and 2002.

In 1997, playing a South African exiled to America who returns 15 years later, Cube starred in the action thriller Dangerous Ground, and had a supporting role in Anaconda. In 1998, writing again, the director Ice Cube debuted in The Players Club. In 1999, he starred alongside George Clooney and Mark Wahlberg as a staff sergeant in Three Kings, set in the immediate aftermath of the Gulf War, whereby the United States attacked Iraq in 1990, an "intelligent" war comedy critically acclaimed. In 2002, Cube starred in Kevin Bray's All About the Benjamins, and in Tim Story's comedy film Barbershop.

In 2004, Cube played in Barbershop 2 and Torque. The next year, he replaced Vin Diesel in the second installment of the XXX film series, XXX: State of the Union, as the main protagonist, which he reprises the character in the third installment and reunited with Diesel 12 years later, XXX: Return of Xander Cage. He also appeared in the family comedy Are We There Yet?, which premised his role in its 2007 sequel Are We Done Yet?. In 2012, Cube appeared in 21 Jump Street. He also appeared in its sequel, 22 Jump Street, in 2014. That year, and then to return in 2016, he played alongside comedian Kevin Hart in two more Tim Story films, Ride Along and Ride Along 2. Also in 2016, Cube returned for the third entry in the Barbershop series. And in 2017, Cube starred with Charlie Day in the comedy Fist Fight.

Documentary
In late 2005, Ice Cube and R. J. Cutler co-created the six-part documentary series Black. White., carried by cable network FX.

Ice Cube and basketball star LeBron James paired up to pitch a one-hour special to ABC based on James's life.

On May 11, 2010, ESPN aired Cube's directed documentary Straight Outta L.A., examining the interplay of Los Angeles sociopolitics, hip hop, and the Raiders during the 1980s into the 1990s.

Serial television
Ice Cube's Are We There Yet? series premiered on TBS on June 2, 2010. It revolves around a family adjusting to the matriarch's new husband, played by Terry Crews. On August 16, the show was renewed for 90 more episodes, amounting to six seasons. Cube also credits Tyler Perry for his entrée to TBS. In front of the television cameras, rather, Cube appeared with Elmo as a 2014 guest on the PBS children's show Sesame Street.

Controversies
In October 2021, Ice Cube was set to star in the comedy film Oh Hell No alongside Jack Black, but left the project after refusing to get vaccinated for COVID-19. The project would have paid him $9 million.

Accusations of anti-Semitism 
In 2020, Marlow Stern writing in the Daily Beast accused Ice Cube of a "long, disturbing history of anti-Semitism". This traces to his 1991 song "No Vaseline", which uses racial slurs against the other former members of N.W.A. and calls the group's manager Jerry Heller a "white man", "white boy", "Jew", "devil", "white Jew", and "cracker". In 2015, Ice Cube expressed regret at including the word "Jew" in the song, as he intended to attack Heller, not "the whole Jewish race".

In 2015, he was sued for—but has denied—ordering a rabbi to be assaulted. During the assault, he allegedly uttered anti-Semitic slurs against the rabbi for wearing a yarmulke.

In June 2020, some of Ice Cube's Twitter posts—promoting Nation of Islam leader Louis Farrakhan, and an allegedly antisemitic mural, with the caption, "Fuck the new normal until they fix the old normal!", and associated conspiracy theories—triggered wide accusations of antisemitism. Calling himself "just pro-Black", not "anti anybody", Cube dismissed "the hype", and professed "telling my truth".

Discography

Studio albums
 AmeriKKKa's Most Wanted (1990)
 Death Certificate (1991)
 The Predator (1992)
 Lethal Injection (1993)
 War & Peace Vol. 1 (The War Disc) (1998)
 War & Peace Vol. 2 (The Peace Disc) (2000)
 Laugh Now, Cry Later (2006)
 Raw Footage (2008)
 I Am the West (2010)
 Everythang's Corrupt (2018)

Filmography

Films

Television

Video games

Awards and nominations

Film awards
Ice Cube has received nominations for several films in the past. To date, he has won two awards:

2000: Blockbuster Entertainment Award: Favorite Action Team (for Three Kings)
2002: MECCA Movie Award: Acting Award

Music awards
 VH1 Hip Hop Honors 2006
 2006 Honoree Snoop Dogg
 BET Hip-Hop Awards 2009
 BET Honores 2014

Other
Hollywood Walk of Fame star 2017

References

External links

 
 
 

 
1969 births
Living people
20th-century American male actors
20th-century American rappers
20th-century Muslims
21st-century American male actors
21st-century American rappers
21st-century Muslims
African-American film directors
African-American film producers
African American–Jewish relations
African-American male actors
African-American male rappers
African-American Muslims
African-American record producers
African-American screenwriters
African-American songwriters
African-American television producers
American draughtsmen
American film producers
American hip hop record producers
American male film actors
American male rappers
American male screenwriters
American male songwriters
American male television actors
American male video game actors
American male voice actors
American music industry executives
American music video directors
American philanthropists
Big3 people
Capitol Records artists
Converts to Islam
EMI Records artists
Film directors from Los Angeles
Film producers from California
Gangsta rappers
Interscope Records artists
Male actors from California
Male actors from Los Angeles
Members of the Nation of Islam
Mount Westmore members
N.W.A members
People from Baldwin Hills, Los Angeles
Priority Records artists
Rappers from California
Rappers from Los Angeles
Record producers from California
Ruthless Records artists
Screenwriters from California
Songwriters from California
Television producers from California
West Coast hip hop musicians
Westside Connection members
William Howard Taft Charter High School alumni